Lay Me by the Shore is a Canadian short drama film, directed by David Findlay and released in 2022. Acted by a cast of non-professional teen actors, the film stars Isla Pouliot as Noah, a transgender teenager trying to navigate his grief over the death of his best friend in an accident as he completes his final months of high school.

Its cast also includes Kai Smith, Aslan Campbell, Gwenna Cooper, Nicky Lee Evans, Vivi Harder and Brennan Smart.

The film premiered in the Generation14Plus program at the 72nd Berlin International Film Festival, and had its Canadian premiere at the 2022 Toronto International Film Festival.

The film was named to TIFF's annual year-end Canada's Top Ten list for 2022.

References

External links

2022 films
2022 short films
2022 drama films
2022 LGBT-related films
Canadian drama short films
Canadian LGBT-related short films
2020s English-language films
2020s Canadian films
Films about trans men